Ahmad-e Omran (also Romanized as Aḩmad-e ‘Omrān; also known as Maʿbūdī) is a village in Jazireh-ye Minu Rural District, Minu District, Khorramshahr County, Khuzestan Province, Iran. At the 2006 census, its population was 494, in 106 families.

References 

Populated places in Khorramshahr County